Bhare is a village in Mulshi taluka of Pune District in the state of Maharashtra, India. The village is administrated by a Sarpanch who is an elected representative of village as per constitution of India and Panchayati raj (India).

References

External links
  Villages in Mulshi taluka 
  Villages in pune maharashtra

Villages in Pune district